is a  railway station located in the city of Hitachinaka, Ibaraki Prefecture, Japan operated by the East Japan Railway Company (JR East).

Lines
Sawa Station is served by the Jōban Line, and is located 125.3 km from the official starting point of the line at Nippori Station.

Station layout
The station consists of two opposed side platforms connected to the station building by a footbridge. The station is attended.

Platforms

History
Sawa Station was opened on 25 February 1897. The station was absorbed into the JR East network upon the privatization of the Japanese National Railways (JNR) on 1 April 1987.

Passenger statistics
In fiscal 2019, the station was used by an average of 3887 passengers daily (boarding passengers only).

Surrounding area
 Kasamatsu Stadium
 JGSDF Camp Katsuta

See also
 List of railway stations in Japan

References

External links

  Station information JR East Station Information 

Railway stations in Ibaraki Prefecture
Jōban Line
Railway stations in Japan opened in 1897
Hitachinaka, Ibaraki